The UST Christmas Concert is an annual musical event of the University of Santo Tomas in Manila, Philippines.

Event

Performers and guests

Sponsors

Television coverage

References

Christmas Concert
Christmas in the Philippines
Events in Metro Manila
Christmas concerts